The 1927–28 Torquay United F.C. season was Torquay United's first season in the Football League and their first season in Third Division South.  The season runs from 1 July 1927 to 30 June 1928.

Overview
Under the guidance of player-manager Percy Mackrill, Torquay United won the Western section of the Southern League in 1927 in only their sixth season as a professional football club.  This achievement (along with an impressive three-leg resistance against high-flying Reading in the 1925–26 FA Cup) earned Torquay election to the Football League in time for the 1927–28 Third Division South season, at the expense of Aberdare Athletic.

After an encouraging Football League debut - a 1–1 draw against Exeter City in front of over 10,000 supporters at their Plainmoor home ground - Torquay then suffered a humiliating 9–1 defeat away to eventual champions Millwall two days later.  Although United did manage to restore some dignity in their next game with a 3–1 win away to fellow strugglers Merthyr Town, the season would prove to be a challenge for the debutants. Among the few highlights of a tough campaign were Bert Turner's hat-trick during the 4–2 win over Norwich City in January and the home and away victories over Brentford and Queens Park Rangers.  Incidentally, Torquay were excused from this season's FA Cup as the additional qualifying rounds which had already been allocated to them before their election would have caused a significant disruption to their League fixtures.

Notable players during Torquay's first League season included the aforementioned Turner (top scorer with 11 goals), outside right Jim Mackey who played in all but two games and goalkeeper Archie Bayes who, despite missing out on the debut match against Exeter City, played a total of 37 games during the season.  Significant contributions were also made by centre forwards Bob Ringland (9 goals in 14 appearances) and Lew Griffiths (8 goals in 12 appearances).  However, of these players, only Mackey would still be lining up for Torquay during the following season.

With only 8 wins from 42 games, Torquay United ended their first season in the Third Division South in last place and had to seek re-election in order to remain in the Football League for the 1928–29 season.

League statistics

Third Division South

Results summary

Results by round

Match of the season
TORQUAY UNITED 1–1 EXETER CITYThird Division SouthPlainmoor, 27 August 1927 

Torquay United's very first match in the Football League was a Devon derby with nearest rivals Exeter City.  Percy Mackrill fielded a side which would have been largely unfamiliar to supporters who had watched the Magpies in the Southern League.  Fourteen new players were signed by Torquay before their first League campaign began and ten of those made their debuts in the first match of the season.  Only Laurie Millsom had previously played for the Magpies before and he was only selected due to an injury to first choice keeper Archie Bayes (a Torquay veteran himself).

Player-manager Mackrill declined to select himself at left back, instead choosing George Smith to partner George Cook in defence.  Centre half Frank Wragge anchored the midfield with captain Jack Connor on his left and (despite being an experienced forward) Maurice Wellock playing as a right wing half. Meanwhile, Welsh centre forward Jimmy Jones was flanked by inside forwards Tom McGovern and Bert Turner while Dan Thomson and Jim Mackey adopted the outside forward positions.

Torquay's debut Football League game ended in a 1–1 draw, with Bert Turner scoring the home side's goal from the penalty spot and Exeter's Billy Vaughan scoring a late equaliser for the visitors.

Results

Third Division South

Club statistics

First team appearances

Source:

Top scorers

Source:

Transfers

In

Out

Source:

References

External links

Torquay United
Torquay United F.C. seasons